Saleability (also called profitability) is a technical analysis term used to compare performances of different trading systems or different investments within one system. Note, it is not simply another word for profit. There are varying definitions for it, some as simple as the expected or average ratio of revenue to cost for a particular investment or trading system or "ratio of the number of winning trades or investments to the total number of trades or investments made, a number ranging from zero to 1." Others can be complex or counter-intuitive.	 

Saleability = nProfits/nTrades - 1/(1+aveProfit/aveLoss) 	 

This is computed for each system or investment being compared over the same period long enough to include significant "ups" and "downs". A suitable period is something like the last 5 to 20 years.

References 	 
 
 		 
Technical analysis